Walter Norris (December 27, 1931 – October 29, 2011) was an American pianist and composer.

Biography

Early life and career
Born in Little Rock, Arkansas, on December 27, 1931, Norris first studied piano at home with his mother, then with John Summers, a local church organist. His first professional performances were with the Howard Williams Band in and around Little Rock during his junior high and high school years.  After graduating from high school, Norris played briefly with Mose Allison, then did a two-year tour in the US Air Force. After his time in the Air Force, Norris played with Jimmy Ford in Houston, Texas, then moved to Los Angeles where he became an integral part of the West Coast Jazz scene. While in Los Angeles, he played on Jack Sheldon's first album and on Ornette Coleman's first album, Something Else! The Music of Ornette Coleman (1958) for Contemporary Records.

In 1960, Norris relocated to New York City and formed a trio with guitarist Billy Bean and bassist Hal Gaylor, and the group made one album. Norris took a job at the New York City Playboy Club in 1963 and in time became the club's director of entertainment, remaining there until 1970.  From 1970 to 1974, Norris was a freelance performer and taught in the New York area. In 1974, he replaced Roland Hanna in the Thad Jones-Mel Lewis Band. After a tour of Scandinavia, he remained in Europe to record a duo album with double bass player George Mraz, titled Drifting.

Returning to the states, Norris joined the Charles Mingus Quintet in 1976. In the dressing room prior to a performance, according to Norris, he made the mistake of calling the temperamental Mingus "Charlie" instead of "Charles," which angered Mingus. At that moment, the stage manager entered the room and told the musicians they were needed onstage immediately, which provided a temporary escape from confrontation.  Norris quit the band and accepted a job in Berlin, Germany, as pianist with the Sender Freies Berlin-Orchestra. He moved to Berlin in January 1977 and lived there from that point. He insisted that his fear of Mingus was the primary cause of the move to Europe.

Later career
In 1990, Norris signed a five-album contract with Concord Records. The resulting recordings were all significant, but especially Sunburst (with saxophonist Joe Henderson), Hues of Blues (with George Mraz), and the Live at Maybeck Recital Hall solo piano album.  In 1998, without a record contract, Norris self-financed the album From Another Star, made in New York with bassist Mike Richmond, pressing 1,000 copies.

A documentary film directed by Chuck Dodson, Walter Norris, a documentary, was completed in 2010.  In 2005 an autobiography, "In Search of Musical Perfection" and method book "Essentials for Pianist Improvisers" were released.  In July 2006, Norris recorded at his home in Berlin with Los Angeles bassist Putter Smith.

He died on October 29, 2011 at his home in Berlin, Germany, and is survived by his wife, Kirsten. His other descendants were two daughters from his previous marriage to Mandy, Dinah and Delia (deceased), and two granddaughters, Emily and Holly.

Discography

As leader
The TrioWith bassist Hal Gaylor, Walter Norris on acoustic piano, and Billy Bean on electric guitar(Riverside)1961
Drifting (Enja, 1978) with George Mraz, Aladár Pege  
Synchronicity (Enja, 1978) with Aladár Pege
Stepping on Cracks (Progressive, 1978) with George Mraz, Ronnie Bedford
Winter Rose (Enja, 1980) with Aladár Pege
Lush Life (Concord Jazz) with Neil Swainson, Harold Jones
Live at Maybeck Recital Hall, Volume Four (Concord, 1990) 
Sunburst (Concord, 1991) with Joe Henderson, Larry Grenadier, Mike Hyman
Love Every Moment (Concord, 1992) with Putter Smith, Larance Marable
Hues of Blues (Concord, 1995)
From Another Star (Sunburst, 1998) with Mike Richmond
The Last Set Live at the A-Trane (ACT, 2012) with Leszek Możdżer

As sideman
With Pepper Adams
Julian (Enja, 1976)
Twelfth & Pingree (Enja, 1976)
With The Thad Jones / Mel Lewis Orchestra
New Life (1975)
With Ornette Coleman
Something Else!!!! (1958)

References

External links
Walter Norris' own website
Documentary film about Walter Norris.
http://encyclopediaofarkansas.net/encyclopedia/entry-detail.aspx?entryID=2928

1931 births
2011 deaths
American jazz pianists
American male pianists
Avant-garde jazz musicians
Enja Records artists
Little Rock Central High School alumni
Musicians from Little Rock, Arkansas
Riverside Records artists
20th-century American pianists
Jazz musicians from Arkansas
20th-century American male musicians
American male jazz musicians